Bembidion genei is a species of ground beetle in the family Carabidae, found mainly in the Palearctic.

Subspecies
These four subspecies belong to the species Bembidion genei:
 Bembidion genei genei Küster, 1847
 Bembidion genei hispaniae (Bonavita & Vigna Taglianti, 2010)
 Bembidion genei illigeri Netolitzky, 1914
 Bembidion genei trinacriae (Bonavita & Vigna Taglianti, 2010)

References

Beetles of Europe
Bembidion